Callioratis is a genus of moths in the family Geometridae.

Species
 Callioratis abraxas Felder, 1874
 Callioratis apicisecta Prout, 1915
 Callioratis abraxis
 Callioratis millarii
 Callioratis boisduvalii
 Callioratis grandis

References
 Callioratis at Markku Savela's Lepidoptera and Some Other Life Forms
 Natural History Museum Lepidoptera genus database

Ennominae